The term woodcraft — or woodlore — denotes skills and experience in matters relating to living and thriving in the woods—such as hunting, fishing, and camping—whether on a short- or long-term basis. Traditionally, woodcraft pertains to subsistence lifestyles, with implications of hunting-gathering. In more recent times, and in developed countries, it relates more to either outdoor recreationalism or survivalism.

Techniques
A partial list of recreational woodcraft techniques might include knowledge of wildlife behavior, identifying and utilizing wild plants and animals (especially for food), camp cooking, orienteering (including hiking skills and use of a map and compass), fire making (including procurement of firewood), selecting and preparing a campsite, lashing and knot techniques, the use of tents and wilderness first aid.

Contexts and significance
The Scouting movement has adopted woodcraft techniques as a core skill set known as scoutcraft.

In the United States, woodcraft techniques in a military context are taught as part of SERE (Survival, Evasion, Resistance and Escape) training.

Traditional woodcraft has particular importance in American folklore, especially that relating to the early American frontier.

In the UK, the Woodcraft Folk are an organisation founded on the principles of woodcraft.

See also
Batoning
Bushcraft
Ernest Seton
List of outdoorsmen and outdoor educators
Scoutcraft
Woodcraft (youth movement)
Woodcraft Folk
Woodcraft Indians (the Woodcraft League of America)

References
Kephart, Horace (1906), Camping and Woodcraft: A Handbook for Vacation Campers and for Travelers in the Wilderness; New York, New York: The Outing Publishing Company.

Procedural knowledge
Simple living
Survival skills
Traditions
Scoutcraft